Anne Zerr (born 1954) is a Republican former member of the Missouri House of Representatives. Zerr represented the 18th District, redrawn during her tenure as the 65th District, which encompasses portions of St. Charles County, Missouri. She was first elected to the Missouri House in 2008.

Early life, education and career
Anne Zerr was born in St. Louis, Missouri in 1954. She was raised in the area and graduated from Maplewood Richmond Heights High School. Following high school Zerr attended Lindenwood University, earning a bachelor's degree in human resource development, and later an MBA and a master's degree in human service agency management. Zerr also furthered her education at Harvard University's Kennedy School of Government and the Delinquency Control Institute at USC. Prior to entering politics Zerr worked as executive director for Partners for Progress, director of community affairs for SSM St. Joseph Hospital West, and adult admissions director for Lindenwood University. Zerr is currently an adjunct professor of political science at Lindenwood University. She and husband Michael are the parents of two sons and a daughter.

Politics
Representative Zerr first ran for office in 2008, hoping to fill the 18th district Missouri House seat vacated by Tom Dempsey. Zerr edged out fellow Republican Matthew Seeds in the August 2008 primary. An unusual situation developed for the November general election as Democratic candidate Tim Swope attempted to withdraw from the race. Being unable to do so, Swope declared he would not serve if elected. Zerr won election with 59.4 percent of the vote. In 2010 Zerr defeated Democrat Gary McKiddy to win her second term in the state legislature.

Zerr ran for the Missouri Senate in 2016, but lost in the Republican Primary to businessman Bill Eigel.

Legislative assignments
Representative Zerr served on the following committees:
 Administration and Accounts
 Appropriations – Health, Mental Health, and Social Services
 Chairman, Economic Development
 Joint Committee on Gaming and Wagering
 Tourism and Natural Resources

References

1954 births
Living people
People from St. Charles County, Missouri
Republican Party members of the Missouri House of Representatives
Women state legislators in Missouri
Lindenwood University alumni
Harvard Kennedy School alumni
21st-century American politicians
21st-century American women politicians
Candidates in the 2016 United States elections